Bismarck Barreto Faria, better known as Bismarck (born 11 November 1969) is a Brazilian former professional footballer who played as a midfielder.

Club career
Bismarck was born in São Gonçalo, Rio de Janeiro State. His professional career began in 1987 playing for Vasco da Gama of Brazil. In 1993, he moved to Japan to play for the Verdy Kawasaki of the J1 League. During his three seasons at Verdy, Bismarck was twice selected as a member of the J. League Best Eleven, in 1994 and 1995. In 1997, he moved to Kashima Antlers, where he was again selected for the league's Best Eleven award in his first season with the new club. In 2002, he returned to Brazil to play for the Fluminense and the Goiás. However, in 2003 Bismarck would return to Japan to play for Vissel Kobe before retiring at the end of that season.

International career
Bismarck was part of the Brazil national under-20 football team that placed third in 1989 FIFA World Youth Championship. He won the MVP Award, the Adidas Golden Ball, for his performances throughout the tournament.
At senior level, he was also a member of the Brazilian national team that won the Copa América in 1989, and represented his nation in the 1990 FIFA World Cup in Italy.

Personal life
He is named after Otto von Bismarck, the famous politician who played an important role in the creation of one of the world's Great Powers, the German Empire.

Bismarck, along with one-time Brazilian football teammates Jorginho and Cláudio Taffarel, were featured in a special version of the film Jesus produced and distributed during the 1998 World Cup.

Career statistics

Club

International

Honours

Club
Vasco da Gama
 Campeonato Carioca: 1987, 1988, 1992, 1993
 Campeonato Brasileiro Série A: 1989

Verdy Kawasaki
 J1 League: 1993, 1994Kashima Antlers J1 League: 1998

InternationalBrazil'''
 Copa América: 1989

Individual
 J1 League Best Eleven: 1994, 1995, 1997
 FIFA U-20 World Cup Golden Ball: 1989

References

External links

1969 births
Living people
Brazilian footballers
Brazilian expatriate footballers
Campeonato Brasileiro Série A players
Fluminense FC players
CR Vasco da Gama players
Goiás Esporte Clube players
J1 League players
Tokyo Verdy players
Kashima Antlers players
Vissel Kobe players
1990 FIFA World Cup players
Expatriate footballers in Japan
Brazilian expatriate sportspeople in Japan
Brazil youth international footballers
Brazil under-20 international footballers
Brazil international footballers
People from São Gonçalo, Rio de Janeiro
Association football midfielders
Sportspeople from Rio de Janeiro (state)